The Académie de Dijon was founded by Hector-Bernard Pouffier, the most senior member of the Parlement de Bourgogne, in 1725. It received royal lettres patentes in 1740. In 1775, it became the "Académie des Sciences, Arts et Belles-Lettres de Dijon." From 1855 to 1869, it was called the "Académie Impériale des Sciences, Arts et Belles-Lettres de Dijon" before returning in 1870 to the name "Académie des Sciences, Arts et Belles-Lettres de Dijon."

In July 1750, it sponsored a prize competition on the question of "whether the reestablishment of the sciences and the arts contributed to purifying morals." Jean-Jacques Rousseau won the prize by arguing in the negative, in his Discourse on the Arts and Sciences. In 1754, he again competed for the prize with his Discourse on the Origin and Basis of Inequality Among Men, but did not win the prize that year.

The Académie des Sciences, Arts et Belles-Lettres de Dijon still exists, and still offers the prize.

Famous members 
 Charles de Brosses
 Alexis Piron
 Paul Cunisset-Carnot
 Charles Bonnet, naturalist,
 Étienne Jean Bouchu
 Pierre-Paul Darbois (1785–1861), sculptor
 Maurice Deslandres
 François de Neufchâteau (1750–1828)
 Louis-Bernard Guyton de Morveau
 Stéphen Liégeard
 Hugues Maret
 Lucien Olivier, physician
 Robert Poujade (membre d'honneur)
 Jean-Philippe Rameau
 Gaston Roupnel
 Pierre Quarré

Notes and references 
This is a translation, with interpolations, of the article in the French Wikipedia.

References

External links 
 Académie des Sciences, Arts et Belles-Lettres de Dijon website

Buildings and structures in Dijon
History of Dijon